As-Sawiya is a Palestinian town in the Nablus Governorate of the State of Palestine, in the northern West Bank, located 18 kilometers south of Nablus. According to the Palestinian Central Bureau of Statistics (PCBS), the town had a population of 2,301 inhabitants in mid-year 2006.

Location
As-Sawiya is located 15km south of Nablus. It is bordered by Talfit and Qaryut to the east, Al-Lubban ash-Sharqiya to the south, Iskaka and Al Lubban ash Sharqiya to the west, and Yatma, Qabalan and Yasuf to the north.

History
At the village site, sherds from IA II (8th and 7th century BCE), the Persian or the early Hellenistic period, Crusader era/ Ayyubid dynasty, Mamluk and early Ottoman era have been found. In the 12th and 13th centuries, during the Crusader era, As-Sawiya was inhabited by Muslims, according to Ḍiyāʼ al-Dīn. He also noted that followers of Ibn Qudamah lived here.

Ottoman era
As-Sawiya was incorporated into the Ottoman Empire in 1517 with all of Palestine, and in 1596 it appeared in the tax registers as being in the Nahiya of Jabal Qubal of the Liwa of Nablus. It had a population of 40 households and 2 bachelors, all Muslim. They paid a fixed tax-rate of 33.3% on agricultural products, including wheat, barley, summer crops, olive trees, occasional revenues, goats and beehives; a total of 8,610 akçe. All of the revenue went to a Waqf.

In 1838 Robinson noted As-Sawiya being situated on a hill, located in the Jurat Merda district, south of Nablus.

In 1870 Victor Guérin found that it had three hundred inhabitants, and that the villagers had a mosque.

In 1882, the PEF’s Survey of Western Palestine described Sawiya as "a little village on a hill overhanging the road."

British Mandate era
In the 1922 census of Palestine conducted by the British Mandate authorities, As-Sawiya (called: Sawiyeh) had a population of 476, all Muslims, while in the 1931 census it had 128 occupied houses and a population of 596, again all Muslim.

In the 1945 statistics Es Sawiya had a population of 820, all Muslims, with 10,787 dunams of land, according to an official land and population survey. Of this, 4,394 dunams were plantations and irrigable land, 3,412 used for cereals, while 40 dunams were built-up (urban) land.

Jordanian era
In the wake of the 1948 Arab–Israeli War, and after the 1949 Armistice Agreements, As-Sawiya came under Jordanian rule. 

The Jordanian census of 1961 found 1,151 inhabitants.

post-1967

Since the Six-Day War in 1967, As-Sawiya has been under Israeli occupation.

After the 1995 accords, approximately 14% of villageland was classified as Area B, the remaining 86% as Area C. Israel has confiscated 1,551 dunums of village land for the Israeli settlement of Alie, and 376 dunams for Rechalim. 

As-Sawiya is entirely dependent on its agricultural land. Prior to the Second Intifada, about 250 of the village's residents worked in Israel, but in 2004 only three continued working there.
The primary crops grown in as-Sawiya are wheat, olives, grapes, figs, and beans. The land is also used for grazing livestock. Some residents produce yoghurt from their cows and sell it. Local residents sell olive oil to nearby villages such as Lubban as well. Stone-cutting is the most important industry in the town after agriculture.

According to locals, village life has been "deeply affected" by harassment from Jewish settlers. "People cannot go and harvest their land. The settlers take our olives, they throw rocks at people."

Khan as-Sawiya (Khirbet Berkit)
Just north-east of the village researchers described the ruins of a khan (caravanserai), at a site known as Khan as-Sawieh or Khirbet Berkit. Byzantine pottery, old tombs and cisterns have been found in the Khan as-Sawieh area. Denys Pringle lists the khan among the Crusader remains in Palestine. In 1838 Robinson found the khan in ruins, and so did de Saulcy in 1850. In the 1882 the PEF's Survey of Western Palestine (SWP) described it as "a small square building, also a ruined Khan; the walls are standing to some height, and drafted stones are used at the corners. Rock-cut tombs exist just south, showing the place to be an ancient site. The name of the site is Khurbet Berkit."

Khirbet Berkit has been described by Charles William Wilson (1836–1905) as likely being identical with first-century CE Borceos, and a nearby ruin called ’Aina with Anuath; Anuath and Borceos are the border town or towns mentioned by Josephus as standing at the border between Samaria and Judea.

Near the spring by the khan, Wilson describes a large oak-tree, ballut in Arabic, of a size very seldom found in what he terms as Southern Palestine.

References

Bibliography

External links
Welcome To al-Sawaiya
Survey of Western Palestine, Map 14:   IAA, Wikimedia commons 
As Sawiya Village Profile, Applied Research Institute–Jerusalem (ARIJ) 
As Sawiya aerial photo, ARIJ
Development Priorities and Needs in As Sawiya, ARIJ
As Sawiya Village Profile, October, 2004
My First Settler Attack, As-Sawiya Electronic Intifada, 25 April 2005
Settlers rampage through West Bank villages, vandalize mosques 02/12/2008, Maan news
An infrastructure of Jewish terror Dror Etkes and Roi Maor, Haaretz, Sep.11, 2009 
 60 Palestinian houses are threatened of Demolition in As Sawiya and Yatma villages in Nablus Governorate  POICA, 03, October, 2009
Palestinians blame 'hilltop youth' for school arson, 10/21/2010, Jerusalem Post
 As Sawiya Girls High School – The Latest Victim of Israeli Colonists, POICA, 29, October, 2010
3 injured as settlers open fire on Palestinian village 08/03/2011, Maan news
As Sawiya

Nablus Governorate
Villages in the West Bank
Municipalities of the State of Palestine